The sixth season of RuPaul's Drag Race began airing February 24, 2014. Like the fifth season, the season featured 14 contestants competing for the title of "America's Next Drag Superstar". For the first time in the show's history, the season premiere was split into two episodes; the fourteen queens were split into two groups and the seven queens in each group competed against each other before being united as one group for the third episode.

Santino Rice and Michelle Visage returned as judges. Two new pit crew members, Miles Moody and Simon Sherry-Wood, joined Jason Carter and Shawn Morales. The winner of this season won a prize package that included a supply from Colorevolution Cosmetics and a cash prize of $100,000. This was also the first season where Absolut Vodka and Interior Illusions, Inc. were not sponsors for the show, more specifically for the Untucked episodes. The Interior Illusions Lounge was renamed to the Silver Lounge or FormDecor Lounge. The theme song played during the runway segment every episode was "Sissy That Walk" while the song playing during the credits is "Dance With U", both from the album Born Naked.

The winner of the sixth season of RuPaul's Drag Race was Bianca Del Rio, with Adore Delano and Courtney Act being the runners-up, and BenDeLaCreme being crowned season 6's Miss Congeniality.

Contestants 

Ages, names, and cities stated are at time of filming.

Notes:

Contestant progress

Lip syncs
Legend:

Guest judges 
Listed in chronological order:

Adam Lambert, singer and actor
Mike Ruiz, photographer
Khloé Kardashian, television personality
Lena Headey, actress
Linda Blair, actress
Lucian Piane, music producer and composer
Sheryl Lee Ralph, actress, singer, and activist
Gillian Jacobs, actress
Heather McDonald, actress and comedian
Eve, rapper and actress
Trina, rapper
Leah Remini, actress
Lainie Kazan, actress and singer
Bruce Vilanch, writer and actor
Jaime Pressly, actress
Chaz Bono, writer and activist
Georgia Holt, actress and singer-songwriter
Paula Abdul, singer, choreographer and television personality
Neil Patrick Harris, actor
David Burtka, actor and chef
Bob Mackie, fashion designer.

Special guests
Guests who appeared in episodes, but did not judge on the main stage.

Episode 4:
Our Lady J, musician and transgender icon

Episodes

Controversy

After use of the term "Shemale" in the "Female or She-male?" challenge of episode 4 led to complaints over transphobic slang specifically from the season contestants Gia Gunn and Courtney Act, as well as previous contestants Carmen Carrera, Willam Belli, and Kylie Sonique Love. Logo temporarily removed the episode from all platforms and stopped using "You've got she-mail" as the video message intro. Episode 4 was eventually put back up on streaming services with the "Female or She-male?" mini-challenge segment removed.

Soundtrack 

In this season the theme song for the series remains unchanged from the original season, only being condensed to a shorter length to allow for more show time. As in previous seasons, while RuPaul enters walking the runway before the judging each episode his song "Cover Girl" plays; an instrumental version of the song continues to play while he introduces the judges and celebrity guests. The main musical change-up of the season comes during the runway while each contestant struts, modeling their looks. As in each previous season, the song changes to promote more album and/or single sales for RuPaul. The song this season played during the segment is "Sissy That Walk", from RuPaul's album Born Naked. Also from the album "Dance with U" plays at the end of each episode while the remaining queens dance on the runway, exiting the stage.

Born Naked essentially serves as a soundtrack for the season. Its release coincided with the season premiere, primarily for promotional reasons. However, in the time just after Logo's release of the season 6 "Meet the Queens" interviews, which announced and introduced the season's cast, an album entitled The CoverGurlz was released digitally presented by RuPaul, meant to promote the upcoming season. The single "Oh No She Better Don't" was also released during the season.

RuPaul Presents: The CoverGurlz 

RuPaul Presents: The CoverGurlz is a 2014 compilation album by entertainer RuPaul, featuring the season 6 cast of his show RuPaul's Drag Race. The album was released on January 28, 2014. The album was only released digitally to iTunes and Amazon.

Background 

Although previous winners and top-three contestants have been given the chance to collaborate with RuPaul either on a song[a] or by performing in one of the artist's music videos, respectively, this album marks the first time in RuPaul's Drag Race history that an album has been produced which features every contestant from the season.

The compilation consists of 14 covers of songs previously released by RuPaul, performed by all of the RuPaul's Drag Race season 6 contestants. It features tracks originally from RuPaul's albums Champion and Glamazon, as well as his extended play SuperGlam DQ, and the 2013 non-album single "Lick It Lollipop". The album also features an outtake from Champion entitled "Let's Turn the Night", reproduced with new vocals by Jason Carter and Miles Davis Moody of the RuPaul's Drag Race pit crew. April Carrión's cover of "Sexy Drag Queen" also features Jipsta from the original version of the song.[b]

As promotion for both the season's contestants and the, then, upcoming season, each contestant is also featured in a short music video for their cover ending with a montage of clips from their respective audition tapes. World of Wonder also produced a music video for the pit crew's song "Let's Turn the Night", which also promoted RuPaul's, then, recently released fragrance Glamazon, released as part of a limited edition make-up line with Colorevolution Cosmetics.

Release history 

Before the compilation's release, RuPaul confirmed on Twitter that a new album, in which each of the Season 6 contestants covered a song from his catalog, would be coming out.

Reception 

The week of release the compilation album debuted at number 6 on the iTunes Dance album chart.

Track listing 
(All writing credits adapted from the liner notes of the albums the songs originally appeared.)

Notes

See also 

 List of Rusicals

References

External links 
  (U.S.)
 Official website (Canada)
 Official Facebook page

2014 American television seasons
RuPaul's Drag Race seasons
2014 in LGBT history